This is a list of all schools (traditional and charter) served by the Baltimore City Public School System in Baltimore, Maryland.

Elementary schools

Elementary/Middle Schools

Middle schools

Middle/High Schools

High schools

Other Schools

References

External links
 
 List of schools directory
 Baltimore Teacher Union  (BTU)
 City Schools Teacher Support System (TSS) 
 Baltimore City Public Schools – Maryland Report Card
 Baltimore City Government

Baltimore
Baltimore-related lists